Nothing Is Forgotten (Swedish: Man glömmer ingenting) is a 1942 Swedish drama film directed by Åke Ohberg and starring Edvin Adolphson, Gerd Hagman and Marianne Löfgren. It was shot at the Centrumateljéerna Studios in Stockholm. The film's sets were designed by the art director Bertil Duroj.

Synopsis 
When Nora's father dies she goes to live her uncle Berthold, encounter the jealousy of his wife Alice. She studies to become a painter.

Cast
 Edvin Adolphson as 	Berthold Segervind
 Gerd Hagman as 	Nora
 Marianne Löfgren as 	Alice
 Peter Höglund as 	Johan
 Viran Rydkvist as 	Sofi
 Åke Grönberg as Blommen
 Hugo Björne as Nora's Father
 Julia Cæsar as 	Miss Kattentitt
 Olga Andersson as 	Mrs. Beerg 
 Åke Claesson as 	Professor Torin
 Anders Frithiof as 	Wick 
 Olav Riégo as 	Dr. Beerg 
 Signe Wirff as 	Mina
 Sif Ruud as 	Anna 
 Wiktor Andersson as Newspaper Vendor 
 Ann-Margret Bergendahl as 	Maid
 Märta Dorff as Dinner guest 
 Georg Fernqvist as 	Dinner guest 
 Bengt Ekerot as Student at art school 
 Elsie Albiin as 	Student at art school

References

Bibliography 
 Qvist, Per Olov & von Bagh, Peter. Guide to the Cinema of Sweden and Finland. Greenwood Publishing Group, 2000.

External links 
 

1942 films
Swedish drama films
1942 drama films
1940s Swedish-language films
Films directed by Åke Ohberg
1940s Swedish films